Paradise Comics is a comic book store located in Toronto, Ontario, Canada. The owner and proprietor is Peter Dixon. The store's manager is long time comic book fan Doug Simpson. Among other merchandise, Paradise Comics sells silver age, 1970s, 1980s and CGC graded comics and CGC Signature Series (signed and graded) comic books. The store is located at 3278 Yonge Street in Toronto.

Paradise Comics Toronto Comicon 

Paradise Comics also puts on comic book conventions: Paradise Comics Toronto Comicon.

In 2009, Wizard Entertainment acquired the Paradise Comics Toronto Comicon, "a show that has been consistently awarded The Best International Comic Book Convention (non-USA) by ComicBookConventions.com, for the last five years."    Peter Dixon will still continue to be involved with the Paradise Comics Toronto Comicon.

References

External links
 Paradise Comics Site

Comics retailers in Canada
Shops in Toronto